Tyler Tiedeman (born April 26, 1985) is an American former basketball player. Tiedeman played college basketball for the Boise State Broncos from 2005 until 2008 and played several years in Europe as a professional player until retirement from the sport in 2013.

Career
Tiedeman grew up in Santa Rosa, California and attended Montgomery High School. He opted for baseball after leaving Montgomery, turning down a contract offer from the Atlanta Braves and accepting a scholarship at the University of Arizona, where he roomed with current Giants closing pitcher Mark Melancon. In his first season pitching at Tucson, though, he blew out his elbow. Tiedeman wound up having Tommy John surgery, effectively ending his baseball career. Tiedeman rededicated himself to basketball, spent one season at Santa Rosa Junior College, and committed to Boise State as a sophomore. During his first two seasons in Boise he roomed with current Los Angeles Laker Coby Karl, son of Denver Nuggets coach George Karl.

In 2008, Tiedeman signed his first professional basketball contract to play in Mallorca, Spain. In August 2010, Tiedeman signed with West-Brabant Giants, a club from Bergen op Zoom, Netherlands. He averaged 14.7 points in the 2010–11 season, and later extended his contract. Because the club eventually was dissolved because of financial problems, he signed with the Finnish team Lappeenrannan NMKY later.

Tiedeman signed with WBC Raiffeisen Wels from Wels, Austria for the 2012–13 season. He was second in scoring with 19.5 points and fifth with 4.1 assists per game in the ABL.

Honors
 WCAA Giants
DBL All-Star (1): 2011

Statistics

Regular season

|-

|-

|-

|}

Playoffs

|-

|-

|}

References

External links
Draftexpress.com profile
Eurobasket profile
RealGM profile
Interperformances profile

1985 births
Living people
American expatriate basketball people in Austria
American expatriate basketball people in Finland
American expatriate basketball people in the Netherlands
American expatriate basketball people in Spain
American men's basketball players
Basketball players from California
Bàsquet Mallorca players
Boise State Broncos men's basketball players
Flyers Wels players
Junior college men's basketball players in the United States
Small forwards
Sportspeople from Santa Rosa, California
West-Brabant Giants players